The Maningoza is a river in western Madagascar. It crosses the Maningoza Reserve and has its mouth into the Indian Ocean near Besalampy.

There are crocodiles in the Maningoza river.

References

Rivers of Madagascar
Rivers of Melaky